The Bureau of Navigation, later the Bureau of Navigation and Steamboat Inspection and finally the Bureau of Marine Inspection and Navigation — not to be confused with the United States Navys Bureau of Navigation — was an agency of the United States Government established in 1884 to enforce laws relating to the construction, equipment, operation, inspection, safety, and documentation of merchant vessels. The bureau also investigated marine accidents and casualties; collected tonnage taxes and other navigation fees; and examined, certified, and licensed merchant mariners.

When established, the Bureau of Navigation was a part of the United States Department of the Treasury.  In 1903, the organization was transferred to the newly formed United States Department of Commerce and Labor.  In 1913 that department was split into the United States Department of Commerce and the United States Department of Labor, and the bureau was assigned to the new Department of Commerce. In 1932 the bureau was combined with the Steamboat Inspection Service to form the Bureau of Navigation and Steamboat Inspection. The Bureau of Navigation and Steamboat Inspection was in turn renamed the Bureau of Marine Inspection and Navigation in 1936.

In 1942, Executive Order 9083 transferred many functions of the bureau to two other agencies: Merchant vessel documentation was transferred to the United States Customs Service, while functions relating to merchant vessel inspection, safety of life at sea, and merchant mariners were transferred to the United States Coast Guard. The merchant vessel documentation functions were also transferred to the Coast Guard in 1946.

With all its functions having been absorbed by the U.S. Customs Service and the U.S. Coast Guard, the Bureau of Marine Inspection and Navigation was abolished as unnecessary and redundant by Reorganization Plan No. III of 1946.

Flags
Ships of the Bureau of Navigation, the Bureau of Navigation and Steamboat Inspection, and the Bureau of Marine Inspection and Navigation flew a blue flag with a white three-masted sailing ship within a red disc. Ships of the bureau with the director of the bureau embarked also flew the directors flag, which featured the same white three-masted sailing ship on a completely blue field.

References

Sources
US National Archives
Records of the Bureau of Marine Inspection and Navigation
Records of the U.S. Navy Bureau of Navigation

History of the United States Coast Guard
United States Department of the Treasury
United States Department of Commerce
1884 establishments in the United States
1946 disestablishments in the United States
Public safety ministries
Navigation
Navigation
1932 establishments in Washington, D.C.
Government agencies established in 1884
Government agencies disestablished in 1946